The Nine Realms may refer to:
 DreamWorks Dragons: The Nine Realms, an American computer animated television series in the How to Train Your Dragon franchise
 The Níu Heimar ("Nine Worlds") of Norse cosmology